The Dione 98 is a sailboat, that was designed by Gary Mull as an International Offshore Rule Half Ton class racer and first built in 1970.

The boat's designation indicates its approximate length overall in decimetres.

Production
The boat was built by Nautiber SA in Spain, starting in 1970, but is now out of production.

Design
The Dione 98 is a small recreational keelboat, built predominantly of fiberglass. It has a masthead sloop rig, an internally-mounted, spade-type rudder and a fixed fin keel. It displaces  and carries  of ballast. It has a  water tank and a  fuel tank.

See also
List of sailing boat types

References

Keelboats
1970s sailboat type designs
Sailing yachts
Sailboat type designs by Gary Mull
Sailboat types built by Nautiber